Patrick McMullan is an American photographer, columnist, television personality and socialite. His photo work focuses on people, particularly A-list celebrities, superstar fashion designers, models, actors, politicians, cultural icons and the power elite.

Early years

McMullan was born into an Irish-American Catholic family in New York City and raised in Huntington, New York (on Long Island). He attended New York University, earning a degree in business. Work as an amateur photographer began when he was in his 20s. Interest in photographing celebrities and famous people evolved with initial encouragement from Andy Warhol while attending nightlife and events in Manhattan, and through their ongoing friendship until Warhol's untimely death in 1987.

Print Publication
McMullan's work appears regularly in such publications as New York Times Magazine, Vogue Magazine, Allure Magazine, Interview, Harper's Bazaar, Details, Ocean Drive, Gotham, Out, The Boulevard Magazine and amNewYork. He is a contributing editor at Vanity Fair and has a weekly column in New York Magazine (called  "Party Lines").

Online Publication
On January 1, 2011, Patrick McMullan launched his online magazine PMc Magazine.  The magazine is a venue for showcasing interesting people, events and art.  It obviously has a close tie to New York City's nightlife, considering that Patrick McMullan is its founder, but its scope will not end there.  It will include images and stories on art, fashion, film, television, music, literature, travel, business, politics, etc.

Television
Television appearances includes the "Party Flash" segment of "Full Frontal Fashion" on WE: Women's Entertainment cable channel, and guest appearances on celebrity related features by other network producers.

Photo Books
As a photo book publisher Patrick McMullan has edited and compiled six photo books:
 Glamour Girls

Large collection (over 1400 images) of photographs of the world's most celebrated women spanning Patrick's 30-year career. Focus on sophisticated galas of society, Hollywood parties, famed New York nightlife and major charity events.
 Kiss Kiss
A compilation of over 1,000 black and white and color images of famous, beautiful, people kissing spanning 30 years.
 So '80s

A photographic diary of the 1980s decade of the famous figures who defined New York City's nightlife.
 InTents

A decade long photo compilation of fashion and the fascination surrounding the fashion industry using New York's "Bryant Park-based Fashion Week" and the event "7th on Sixth" as a backdrop.
 Secrets of the Riviera

A Photo Essay, of the backstage action at the "Victoria's Secret" fashion show held at the 2000 Cannes Film Festival and the opulent atmosphere of the surrounding A-list parties.
 Men's Show

Photo compilation of men's fashion featuring designers, models and actual men's fashion show images from 1995 - 2000. Designers such as Michael Kors, Calvin Klein, Tommy Hilfiger, Sean John, Marc Jacobs and others are featured.

Controversy
Patrick McMullan has received critique from customers due to his agency's practice of charging subjects of his photos to have their unwanted photographs removed from his website. At times, subjects are candidly photographed while McMullan photographers roam events. New York Times and Gawker have reported that McMullan will remove photos from his website but "for a fee". Online gossip maven, Nick Denton, described Patrick McMullan's practice in a blog post as “something close to blackmail.” McMullan told Page Six, “I charge $10 to take photos down". $10 per photo is substantial with a website that received "as many as one million hits a day" back in 2004. In a 2014 incident at a soiree attended by actor Leonardo DiCaprio, DiCaprio allegedly confronted a photographer for agency Patrick McMullan who had snapped a photo of the actor.

References

External links
 Patrick McMullan official website; accessed December 24, 2014.
 PMc Magazine official website; accessed December 24, 2014.

Living people
American people of Irish descent
American photojournalists
Fashion photographers
Stock photographers
New York University alumni
People from Huntington, New York
Writers from New York (state)
Year of birth missing (living people)